The 2024 Ohio Senate elections will be held on November 5, 2024, to elect senators in 16 even-numbered districts of the Ohio Senate. Members will be elected in single-member constituencies to four-year terms. These elections will be held concurrently will various federal and state elections, including for U.S. President and U.S. Senate.

Overview

Outgoing incumbents

Republicans 
 District 10: Bob Hackett is term-limited.
 District 12: Matt Huffman is term-limited.
 District 16: Stephanie Kunze is term-limited.
 District 24: Matt Dolan is term-limited.
 District 30: Frank Hoagland is term-limited.

Democrats 
 District 28: Vernon Sykes is term-limited.

See also 
 2024 Ohio elections

References 

Ohio Senate
Senate
Ohio Senate elections